The Seguros Bolívar Open Medellín was a new addition to the ITF Women's Circuit.

Verónica Cepede Royg won the inaugural tournament, defeating Irina-Camelia Begu in the final, 6–4, 4–6, 6–4.

Seeds

Main draw

Finals

Top half

Bottom half

References 
 Main draw

Seguros Bolivar Open Medellin - Singles
Seguros Bolívar Open Medellín